Brandon Antone Hixon (October 26, 1981 – January 9, 2018) was an American politician and a Republican Partymember of the Idaho House of Representatives from 2012 to 2017, representing District 10, Seat A. He resigned in late 2017 while under criminal investigation and committed suicide in January 2018.

Education
Hixon, a fourth-generation Idahoan, was born in 1981 and raised in Salmon, Idaho. He graduated from Salmon High School. He went on to graduate from Idaho State University with a degree in construction management.

Elections

2012
Hixon ran against Jarom Wagoner for the Republican nomination winning with 51.5% of the vote.

Hixon won on the November 6, 2012, general election with 6,677 votes (54.0%) against Democratic nominee Travis Manning.

2014
Hixon was unopposed in the May Republican Primary.

Hixon defeated Manning again, winning with 58.9% of the vote.

2016
Hixon was unopposed in the May Republican Primary.

Hixon defeated Jeremy Lopett in the general election winning with 67.0% of the vote.

Criminal investigation and resignation  
On October 18, 2017, the Caldwell, Idaho, police department confirmed that Hixon was the subject of a criminal investigation. On October 19, 2017, Hixon submitted his letter of resignation via email to House Speaker Scott Bedke and Governor Butch Otter, effective immediately. On October 26, 2017, the Caldwell Police Department turned the criminal investigation over to the Idaho Attorney General's Office. On October 31, 2017, it was reported that Hixon was under investigation for "sexual abuse allegations" from a police report dated October 25, 2017.

In January 2018, an article in the Idaho Statesman cited police records indicating Hixon was suspected of repeated and protracted sexual abuse of two minor females, one of them a relative. He committed suicide before the case was taken before a grand jury and was never charged with any crime.

Personal life and death
Hixon and his wife, Danielle, had five children. They divorced in 2016. Not all of his children were with his wife, Danielle. In 2004 and 2005 Brandon fathered two children with Ashley Jo Graham, to whom he was never married.

On January 9, 2018, a family member found Hixon dead from a self-inflicted gunshot wound to the head at his home in Caldwell, Idaho. He was 36 years old.

References

External links
Brandon A. Hixon at the Idaho Legislature
Archived Campaign Site

1981 births
2018 deaths
Boise State University alumni
Idaho State University alumni
Republican Party members of the Idaho House of Representatives
People from Caldwell, Idaho
People from Salmon, Idaho
21st-century American politicians
Suicides by firearm in Idaho
American politicians who committed suicide
2018 suicides